Honky Tonk Rebels is a 2014 Lasse Stefanz studio album, released on 18 June 2014. It topped the Swedish albums chart.

Track listing
Var rädd om kärleken
Länge leve honky tonk
Jag skulle ge vad som helst
Om jag gick på vatten
Vem vet
Brevet från kolonien (Hello Muddah, Hello Fadduh, duet with Jack Vreeswijk)
Baton rouge
Om jag kommer om natten
Jag är strandad på Jamaica
Älska glömma och förlåta
Reckless Heart
Don't Mess with My Toot-Toot
Ensam och svag
När mitt hjärta slutat slå

Charts

Weekly charts

Year-end charts

Certifications

References

2014 albums
Lasse Stefanz albums